Ozalp Babaoğlu (born August 10, 1955 in Ankara, Turkey), is a Turkish computer scientist. He is currently professor of computer science at the University of Bologna, Italy. He received a Ph.D. in 1981 from the University of California at Berkeley. He is the recipient of 1982 Sakrison Memorial Award, 1989 UNIX International Recognition Award and 1993 USENIX Association Lifetime Achievement Award for his contributions to the UNIX system community and to Open Industry Standards. Before moving to Bologna in 1988, Babaoğlu was an associate professor in the Department of Computer Science at Cornell University. He has participated in several European research projects in distributed computing and complex systems. Babaoğlu is an ACM Fellow, a resident fellow of the Institute of Advanced Studies at the University of Bologna and has served on the editorial boards for ACM Transactions on Computer Systems, ACM Transactions on Autonomous and Adaptive Systems and Springer-Verlag Distributed Computing.

Babaoğlu is an avid cyclist and has a son and daughter.

BSD Unix
While pursuing his Ph.D. at Berkeley, Babaoğlu was a principal designer of BSD Unix, also known as BSD, from which spring many modern forms of UNIX, including FreeBSD, NetBSD, and OpenBSD. The Berkeley version of UNIX became the standard in education and research, garnering development support from DARPA, and was notable for introducing virtual memory and internet-working using TCP/IP to UNIX. BSD was widely distributed in source form so that others could learn from it and improve it; this style of software distribution has now led to the open source movement, of which BSD is now recognized to be one of the earliest examples. With Bill Joy, the co-founder of Sun Microsystems, he implemented virtual memory in BSD on hardware lacking page reference bits.

References

External links
 Ozalp Babaoglu's home page

Turkish computer scientists
Turkish academics
Cornell University faculty
Fellows of the Association for Computing Machinery
Academic staff of the University of Bologna
UC Berkeley College of Engineering alumni
BSD people
Living people
1955 births